The Angelo Coast Range Reserve  is located in the Northern Outer California Coast Ranges, in Mendocino County, Northern California. The  7,660-acre reserve includes a section of the Eel River and a portion of Elder Creek, a National Natural Landmarks.

Heath and Marjorie Angelo bought the property in 1931 and sold the land to The Nature Conservancy in 1959. In 1989, an agreement with the University of California incorporated the property into the University of California Natural Reserve System. The reserve is affiliated with departments at the University of California, Berkeley.  The Angelo Reserve was designated part of the California Coast Ranges International Biosphere Reserve in 1983.

Habitats in the reserve encompass mixed forests (including mixed evergreen, California bay, tanoak, madrone, upland redwood, upland Douglas-fir, Pacific yew, and knobcone pine); woodlands (including Oregon oak, black oak, interior live oak, and mixed north-slope cismontane); mixed chaparral (including chamise, montane manzanita, whitethorn, tobacco brush, buck brush, interior live oak, and north-slope chaparral); bald hills prairie; grassland; freshwater seep; coastal winter steelhead trout stream; and coastal salmon stream.

The riparian zone of the Eel River is home to many interesting species, including the tailed frog.

See also
Natural history of the California Coast Ranges

References

External links 
 Angelo Coast Range Reserve website

University of California Natural Reserve System
Protected areas of Mendocino County, California
University of California, Berkeley